Instant Justice, a.k.a. Marine Issue is a 1987 action-drama film starring Michael Paré, Charles Napier, Eddie Avoth and Tawny Kitaen. Pare plays the role of Scott Youngblood, a marine in Spain who seeks revenge for his sister's murder. The movie was written by Craig T. Rumar. The film was directed by Denis Amar.

Plot
Scott is a US Marine who serves in the US embassy in Paris. One day he gets a  message that his long unseen sister Kim, who works as a model in Spain, is in serious trouble; he asks for a dismissal from his outpost and travels to Spain to help her. 
Unfortunately she's murdered before Scott's arrival. Local police are somewhat reluctant to take any action, so Scott starts investigation on his own.

After a couple of days of sniffing around, he meets with Kim's girlfriend, Virginia, who's pointing him towards drug business-related people who might be responsible for the crime. Fellow Marine Major Davis (played by Charles Napier), who serves in the Spanish embassy, is of great assistance to Scott as well, as he risks his own neck and steals some weapons from the embassy for him. At the end Scott finds the people responsible for his sister's death and serves them instant justice.

Cast
 Michael Paré as Sgt. Scott Youngblood
 Tawny Kitaen as Virginia
 Peter Crook as Jake
 Charles Napier as Maj. Davis
 Eddie Avoth as Silke
 Scott Del Amo as Dutch
 Lynda Bridges as Kim Taylor
 Lionel A. Ephraim as Ambassador Gordon
 Maurice E. Aronow as Shelton
 Aldo Sambrell as Lt. Juan Muñoz (credited as Aldo San Brell)
 Peter Boulter as Clarke
 Thomas Abbott as Lt. Harding
 Anthony Bingham as Sgt. Walker
 Scott Miller as Col. Parker
 Steve Heywood as Cpl. Atkinson (credited as Steve Haywood)
 Manuel de Blas as Ochoa
 Angel Mancuso as Tony

References

External links

1986 films
1986 action films
Films shot in Gibraltar
1980s English-language films